The Mann Cup is the trophy awarded to the senior men's box lacrosse champions of Canada. The championship is a best-of-seven, East vs West series played between the league champions of Major Series Lacrosse, the East, and Western Lacrosse Association, the West.

The original trophy is now permanently located in the Canadian Lacrosse Hall of Fame. It is one of the most valuable in all of sports; made of solid, albeit low-karat, gold, the trophy was valued at CA$60,000 when appraised by Birks in May 1980.

History 

It was donated in 1910 by Sir Donald Mann; prior to then, the Minto Cup was the senior amateur championship trophy. The Mann Cup was originally a challenge trophy, but in 1925 the champion New Westminster Salmonbellies turned the trophy over to the Canadian Lacrosse Association who instituted a national playoff system. The challenges and championships for the Mann Cup were played by the rules of traditional field lacrosse until 1932, when box lacrosse was adopted by the Canadian Lacrosse Association. The first indoor Mann Cup was played at Maple Leaf Gardens in Toronto in October 1932.

There have actually been three Mann Cup trophies in existence - the original and two replicas. The original 1910 trophy was in use from 1910 until 1985, when it was retired permanently to the Canadian Lacrosse Hall of Fame. A replica trophy, which has a larger and taller base than the original 1910 trophy, was in use and awarded to teams from 1986 until 2004 when it was destroyed in a bonfire mishap in Peterborough. The second replica replaced the first replica in 2005, and its appearance mirrors the previous 1986 replica trophy and not the original 1910 trophy.

1914 Calgary Chinooks dispute
In 1914, the Vancouver Athletic Club defeated the Calgary Chinooks and Brampton Excelsiors in Mann Cup challenge matches but the Mann Cup Trustees disputed the status of one of the Vancouver players in the series versus Brampton.

Despite the views of British Columbia lacrosse, national lacrosse and amateur athletic organisations that supported Vancouver's position, the trustees instead awarded the cup to the Calgary Chinooks on September 29, 1914. Vancouver however held on to the gold trophy and refused to turn it over to either the trustees or the Chinooks. On December 7, 1914, the Canadian Amateur Lacrosse Association overruled Mann Cup trustee Joseph Lally and awarded the cup to the Vancouver Athletic Club.

1922 Vancouver Lacrosse Club
In 1922, there were two rival leagues located in British Columbia battling for the Mann Cup: Vancouver Lacrosse Club and Victoria Capitals played in the British Columbia Amateur Lacrosse Association's senior league while the New Westminster Salmonbellies and Vancouver Elks played in the Pacific Coast Amateur Lacrosse Association. Control of the Mann Cup was retained by the BCALA after New Westminster left that league to join the PCALA. Vancouver Lacrosse Club won their schedule and were awarded the Mann Cup, while New Westminster won their series in the PCALA.

Just over a month later, Vancouver Lacrosse Club and New Westminster met in a three-game, total goals series to determine who would take home the Mann and Kilmarnock Cups. After Vancouver (who were at the time considered the holders of the Mann Cup) were up 7–6 in goals after two games, they then defaulted their third game after a brawl broke out and the team refused to return to the field. The score was 1-1, so New Westminster lined up and they then went through the formal motions of scoring two unopposed goals into the empty net to take the series and the silverware back by 9 goals to 8.

1963 Cornwall, Ontario series
In 1963, Cornwall, Ontario was named as host city for the Mann Cup despite not even having a senior lacrosse team nor ever participating in the Mann Cup previously.

The Western teams at that time were dominating play in Canada over their Eastern brethren, and had turned down their rights for hosting that year as they wanted the finals held in the East for successive back-to-back years to help stimulate and rejuvenate interest in the sport and the tournament. However none of the then-current teams in the Ontario Lacrosse Association league had, or could raise, the $10,000 required by the host for the performance bond posted with the Canadian Lacrosse Association.

Officials in Cornwall stepped up and in August 1963 the city was awarded the hosting rights for the 1963 Mann Cup. When the CLA had issues getting officials, Stewart Begg age 16, stepped in to officiate

Cup mishaps
In 1989, the Mann Cup was stolen from the Canadian Lacrosse Hall of Fame in New Westminster, British Columbia. Despite fears of the cup being melted down for its gold content, it turned up a few weeks later, with a small chunk cut out of the rim, but otherwise intact.

Following the 1999 Mann Cup final, the cup broke during the post-game "victory lap" taken by the Victoria Shamrocks around Memorial Arena.

In 2004, the Peterborough Lakers won the Mann Cup. During a celebratory gathering the replica of the trophy was dropped in a bonfire and was destroyed.

Champions

Records

See also
Mike Kelley Memorial Trophy – Mann Cup MVP award.

References

Notes

Lacrosse competitions in Canada
Lacrosse trophies and awards
Canadian sports trophies and awards
Awards established in 1910
1910 establishments in Canada